Helen Khal (16 April 1923 – 20 May 2009) was an American artist and critic of Lebanese descent.

Early life
Helen Khal was born in Allentown, Pennsylvania to a Lebanese American family from Tripoli, Lebanon. She started her painting career at the age of 21; when illness forced house rest, she began to draw. On a visit to Lebanon in 1946 she met and married a young Lebanese poet, Yusuf al-Khal (they later divorced), and remained in the country to study art at ALBA from 1946 to 1948. She returned to the United States briefly but in 1973, after moving back to Lebanon, she established Lebanon's first permanent art gallery, Gallery One.

Career
With the encouragement of her colleagues, notably well-known Lebanese artist Aref Rayess, Khal pursued her art and she held her first individual exhibition in 1960 in Galerie Alecco Saab in Beirut. Her other one-woman shows took place at Galerie Trois Feuilles d'Or, Beirut (1965); Galerie Manoug, Beirut (1968); at the First National Bank, Allentown, Pennsylvania (1969); in Kaslik, Lebanon (1970); at the Contact Art Gallery, Beirut (1972, 1974 and 1975) and at the Bolivar Gallery in Kingston, Jamaica in 1975. Her work also appeared in the Biennales of Alexandria and São Paulo.

She also taught art at the American University of Beirut from 1967 to 1976 and at the Lebanese American University from 1997 to 1980. She inspired many other artists and her "background concerning art is fully enriched by the many wonders of the world of art."

Helen Khal was also recognized as an author and critic. "From 1966 to 1974, Helen Khal was Art Critic to two Lebanese periodicals, The Daily Star and Monday Morning. (...) She also wrote a number of publications in the Middle East and the USA and frequently lectured on art."

A series of 22 lectures that she gave was collected and published as a book titled The Woman Artist in Lebanon.

Death

On May 20, 2009, Khal suffered a stroke and died.

Khal, who was painting shortly before she died, is remembered for her keen intelligence and probing, witty conversation. The artist on color: “Each color has its own climate, creates its own particular world; inviolate, each color speaks with quiet seduction.” She was survived by her sons, Tarek and Jawad, both mathematicians, five grandchildren, one great-grandchild, and her sister, Seya Parbousingha, also a painter.

References

External links 
 The Woman Artist in Lebanon
 Profile of Helen Khal on One Fine Art
 Remembering Helen Khal, American University of Beirut
 Helen Khal Obituary, The Daily Star, Lebanon
 Helen Khal on Christie's

American women painters
20th-century American women writers
Lebanese painters
Lebanese women painters
Academic staff of the American University of Beirut
Academic staff of Lebanese American University
1923 births
2009 deaths
20th-century American painters
20th-century American women artists
American women academics
21st-century American women